Vicky Moscholiou (Greek: Βίκυ Μοσχολιού, ; 23 May 1943 – 16 August 2005), born in Metaxourgeio in Athens, was a Greek singer. On 14 March 2010, Alpha TV ranked her the 13th top-certified female artist in the nation's phonographic era (since 1960).

Biography

Early years 
Vicky Moscholiou was born during the German Occupation of Greece, a time of hardship and privation. Her family lived in one room. Her father worked in the vegetable market, and her mother suffered from consumption and received a small allowance. They managed to scrape together the money for a plot of land in Upper Agia Varvara and build a home there. Two more children followed, a brother and sister.

"Agia Varvara then, and especially where we lived, was empty. A few houses, endless fields, and quite a few gypsies with their bears and their songs. There was great poverty but I liked it there. I’d wander around barefoot all day, run, play with the other children, fall, hurt myself, get up and do the same all over again. There was however civility and compassion, a feeling for others which I think has slowly vanished with the years."

Her grandfather and grandmother worked at the National Theatre of Greece. He did the lighting, she the costumes. Moscholiou would go with her grandfather and watch the shows. She dreamed of being an actress, but ended up a singer.

Her first break came in 1962 through the intervention of her cousin Effie Linda. Grigoris Bithikotsis remembers how she came to him and asked him to audition Moscholiou when he was rehearsing for a season at Vasilis Cheilas’ club Triana. They arranged a time but Bithikotsis arrived late and nearly missed her.

"You know, if I’d been stopped by traffic lights that afternoon, Vicky Moscholiou might not have become a singer. Listen then: I go through a red light, arrive outside Triana, park my  car and see a girl and a woman leaving. Afterwards I learnt it was her mother. The young girl recognised me." Mr Bithikotsis, I’m Vasiliki, Vicky Moscholiou, about whom my cousin told you. Mr Kostas Papadopoulos and the musicians in the band listened to me and they told me I wouldn’t do.

Come inside, I said to her, so that I can listen to you as well.

So we went inside again, and she and her mother sat down. As soon as I approached the stage Kostas Papadopoulos said to me, "The girl sings out of tune..."

Let me hear her as well, I said.

She sang two songs—I forget which—and I realised that her voice was different..."

Thanks to Bithikotsis, Moscholiou was hired to perform at the Triana. However this was only a small start. She was given a song to sing occasionally, and acknowledged that she learned much from Bithikotsis and Doukissa, with whom she worked.

Career and commercial success 
She rose to fame in 1964 with Stavros Xarhakos' song "Hathike to feggari" (The Moon is Lost), which was composed for the movie Lola. According to Bithikotsis, the composer Xarhakos told Bithikotsis he needed a singer with a different kind of voice for a particular song. Bithikotsis suggested he try Moscholiou, and took her along to be auditioned. However, Giorgos Zampetas remembers things differently.

"One day Stavros Xarhakos came to the shop. Lambropoulos had instructed him to get Moscholiou to sing a song in a film. He fancied her a lot. We regarded her as just a 200 drachma singer. I took 850 drachmas and Bithikotsis—I don’t know. And he takes Moscholiou to record and me to play bouzouki."

Moscholiou continued with collaborations with Giorgos Zambetas, Manos Eleutheriou, Giorgos Katsaros, Akis Panou, and Loukianos Kilaidonis, among other well-known composers and songwriters. Songs she was famous for include "Paei, paei", "Aliti", "Pou pas choris agapi", "Nautis bgike sti steria", "Ta deilina", "Oi metanastes", and "Anthropoi monachoi".

Two of her hits gave their names to night clubs in Athens, "Deilina" (Dusks) and "Ximeromata" (Daybreaks). She was one of the first in Greece to sing both in night clubs and concerts, and she also sang in the royal courts of Greece, Persia and Jordan. She was one of the first entertainers to sing in aid of Cyprus.

Personal life 
In 1967, Moscholiou married the soccer legend Mimis Domazos, although later they divorced. They had two daughters, Evangelia and Rania.

She died in Athens in 2005 following a two-year battle with cancer, leaving a legacy of significant cultural achievements.

In 2008, following a public dispute between Moscholiou's two daughters, the villa she lived in Thrakomakedones was sold fully furnished to the wealthy goldsmith Panagiotis Stylianoudis and his spouse Villy Kamarinopoulou.

Discography 
1966: Ένα Μεσημέρι
1967: Θαλασσινά φεγγάρια (Συμμετοχή)
1969: Κόσμε αγάπη μου
1969: Μια Κυριακή
1970: Βίκυ Μοσχολιού
1970: Το Σαββατόβραδο
1972: Περιπέτειες
1972: Συνοικισμός Α
1973: Στροφές.
1973: Τραγουδά Ξαρχάκο Σπανό
1974: Νυν και αεί
1975: Λαϊκή Παράδοση (Συμμετοχή)
1975: Σκοπευτήριο (Συμμετοχή)
1976: Ανεξάρτητα (Συμμετοχή)
1976: Λεύκωμα
1976: Τα Σήμαντρα (Συμμετοχή) Νομικός
1977: 14 Χρυσές Επιτυχίες
1977: Τραγουδά Σπανό
1978: 14 Χρυσές Επιτυχίες 2
1978: Λαϊκά τραγούδια απ' όλο τον κόσμο
1979: Όταν σε περιμένω
1980: Βίκυ Μοσχολιού
1980: Το Τραμ Το Τελευταίο
1981: Σκουριασμένα χείλια
1982: Αξέχαστες Επιτυχίες
1982: Σ΄ένα Κόσμο σαν κι αυτό
1982: Τραγούδια της Ευτυχίας
1983: Αξέχαστες Επιτυχίες 2
1984: Του σίδερου και του νερού
1986: Στους ανήσυχους δρόμους
1987: Γυμνό
1987: Κόκοτας - Μοσχολιού
1990: Εφημερία
1990: Gro plan
1990: Η Αθήνα τη νύχτα
1990: Μεγάλες Επιτυχίες
1991: Γειά σας που πέφτουν τα σύνορα (Συμμετοχή)
1992: Το καινούριο πράμα
1993: Τα Μπιζουδάκια
1994: Από τους θησαυρούς των 45 στροφών
1995: Ο Τζακ Ο΄ Χάρα
1995: Οι Μεγάλες Επιτυχίες
1995: Τραγουδά Ζαμπέτα
1996: Μια γυναίκα δύο άντρες
1996: Τραγουδάει Αρχοντορεμπέτικα
1996: Τραγούδια από τις 45 στροφές
1997: Αξέχαστες επιτυχίες 3
1998: Οι Μεγάλες φωνές του Ελληνικού τραγουδιού
2000: Τραγούδια από τις 45 στροφές 2
2001: Οι Μεγάλες Επιτυχίες 1
2002: Μεγάλοι Έλληνες Ερμηνευτές 2
2002: Ανοιχτό Βιβλίο
2003: Πήρα απ΄τη Νιότη Χρώματα
2004: Οι Μεγάλες Επιτυχίες 2
2004: Βραδυνό σινιάλο
2005: Εγώ εσένα αγαπώ
2005: Μοσχολιού Βίκυ 40 Χρόνια
2005: 21 Μεγάλα τραγούδια
2006: Τα Κινηματογραφικά
2006: Στα εννέα όγδοα
2008: Βίκυ Μοσχολιού: Δεν ξέρω πόσο σ' αγαπώ (a "best-of" compilation in a box set of six CDs)

Bibliography
 Βίκυ Μοσχολιού: Δεν ξέρω πόσο σ' αγαπώ (biography) by Κώστας Μπαλαχούτης, 2008 (A booklet accompanying the box set with the same title)

References

External links
News of her death, and obituary in Greek. It includes photographs of the singer — from ERT (Greek radio and television news source)
 Βιογραφία της Βίκυς Μοσχολιού (sansimera.gr)
 Η είδηση του θανάτου της Βίκυς Μοσχολιού (in.gr)
 Χρυσοχόος αγόρασε τη βίλα της Μοσχολιού (epsressonews.gr)
 «Μπλόκαραν» το βιβλίο της Μοσχολιού οι κόρες της (newsit.gr)

1943 births
2005 deaths
Deaths from cancer in Greece
20th-century Greek women singers
Greek laïko singers
Singers from Athens